Bennosäule is a stone pillar and bronze statue located in Maxvorstadt, Munich, Bavaria, Germany. It was created by German Bestelmeyer and George Albert Hofer, cast by Ferdinand von Miller, and erected in 1910.

Buildings and structures in Munich
Maxvorstadt